Johann Dietrich Busch (27 December 1700 – 18 July 1753) was a German organ builder.

Life 
After Schnitger's death in 1719, he continued his work in the workshop of the Itzeho organ builder Lambert Daniel Kastens, who had himself been a journeyman master of Schnitger. From 1728, Busch was in charge of Kastens' Itzeho workshop, as the latter had in the meantime moved the headquarters of his workshop to Copenhagen. In 1733, Busch married Katharina Schütte there, who came from Itzehoe and was in turn Kastens' sister-in-law.

As an independent master craftsman, Busch dominated organ building in and around Hamburg in the period between 1733 and 1753. There is also evidence of numerous repairs, conversions and maintenance contracts in the duchies of Schleswig and Holstein as well as in the Oldenburg region.

Bush died in Itzehoe at the age of 52.

Work (selection) 
Busch can be traced back to the following new organ builds:

References

Further reading 
 
 
 
 

 

German pipe organ builders
1700 births
1753 deaths
People from Wunstorf